Dominic Kyle Sandoval (born October 15, 1985), better known as D-Trix, is an American dancer, YouTube personality, television personality, and actor. He is a member of Quest Crew and former member of Fallen Kingz.

Sandoval was a contestant on the third season of So You Think You Can Dance, in which he placed in the Top 8. He then won the third season of America's Best Dance Crew as a part of Quest Crew. After his win, he became a judge on the show. In 2012, Sandoval became the host of the online web series Dance Showdown. In 2019, Sandoval returned to So You Think You Can Dance as a judge on the 16th season.

He was also one of the choreographers for the World of Dance season 2 winning team, The Lab along with Valerie Ramirez, the owner of The Lab Creative Arts Studio, Carrie Calkins, and several other crews.

Early life
Sandoval was born in Roseville, California to Filipino American parents. He was adopted by his step-father Conrad Pete Sandoval at the age of two. However, the documents were mixed up and he became Conrad Pete Dominic Sandoval. He changed it to his current name when he was 16. He grew up in Roseville and graduated from Woodcreek High School in 2003.

Dance career 
He began breakdancing at age 13 and has performed at NBA and WNBA games, as well as won the 2005 "Evolution 2" competition held in Orlando, Florida with his breaking crew, Flexible Flav. Three months before the Los Angeles auditions, in order to prepare, Sandoval took hip-hop and choreography classes. He lists Ivan "The Urban Action Figure"—who has appeared on America's Got Talent—as his favorite professional dancer. Sandoval aspires to learn all styles and genres of dance and to be known as a dancer, rather than just a breaker.

So You Think You Can Dance

On the dance show So You Think You Can Dance, he was known for having a crush on host Cat Deeley, his humor and seemingly constantly dropping his partner, Sabra Johnson in Hairspray group routine, where she was accidentally dropped on her head. He was eliminated on August 2, 2007 and went on tour with the show. He was an All-Star in Season 7, and returned in 2019 in season 16 as a guest judge.

America's Best Dance Crew
Sandoval was a part of the dance crew Quest Crew, who won America's Best Dance Crew Season 3. Sandoval later announced that he would join America's Best Dance Crew's judging panel for its sixth season. 
Dominic rejoined Quest in 2014 and participated along with the rest of the crew in America’s Best Dance Crew All-Stars: Road to the VMAs. Quest Crew was voted America's Best Dance Crew for the second time.

He also recently choreographed for The Lab, a team from West Covina, California, which participated in and ultimately won World of Dance 2018. He has also appeared in the music video for 'Ready To Go (Get Me Out Of My Mind)' by Panic! At The Disco as a background dancer.

YouTube career
Sandoval goes by the name "Dtrix" in his YouTube career. He has two YouTube accounts: "RANDOMinicSHOW" and "theDOMINICshow". As of July 2021, "theDOMINICshow" has over 3,450,000 subscribers. The defunct second channel, "RANDOMinicSHOW", now "RANDOM GUYS" had over 850,000 subscribers. Sandoval has appeared in several nigahiga videos, along with fellow Quest member Victor Kim. He often collaborates with friend and fellow YouTuber, Gabbie Hanna.

Sandoval published a song in October 2013 called, 'The Worst Babysitter Ever', to go with his new iTunes record deal.

Sandoval was a guest judge on the first season of Internet Icon and is the host of the online web series Dance Showdown.

Acting career 
Sandoval starred as the main antagonist, Melvin, in the 2010 short film Agents of Secret Stuff by Wong Fu Productions. Two years later, he starred alongside Chris Brown in the 2013 film Battle of the Year, which was released on September 20. He also appeared in Alvin and the Chipmunks: The Squeakquel as a background dancer. He also appeared in Smosh: The Movie as a nearby student every time Anthony Padilla hits someone using a mop.

References 

1985 births
Living people
American dancers of Asian descent
American people of Filipino descent
America's Best Dance Crew winners
America's Best Dance Crew contestants
So You Think You Can Dance (American TV series) contestants
Internet Icon
21st-century American dancers
People from Roseville, California